The 2022–23 William & Mary Tribe men's basketball team represented the College of William & Mary in the 2022–23 NCAA Division I men's basketball season. The Tribe, led by fourth-year head coach Dane Fischer, played their home games at Kaplan Arena in Williamsburg, Virginia as members of the Colonial Athletic Association.

Previous season
The Tribe finished the 2021–22 season 5–27, 4–14 in CAA play to finish in ninth place. In the CAA tournament, they were defeated by Northeastern in the first round.

Roster

Schedule and results

|-
!colspan=12 style=""| Non-conference regular season

|-
!colspan=12 style=""| CAA regular season

|-
!colspan=9 style=| 

Sources

References

William & Mary Tribe men's basketball seasons
William and Mary Tribe
William and Mary Tribe men's basketball
William and Mary Tribe men's basketball